Nawab Faizunnesa Government College (NFGC) is a government college at Laksam, Cumilla, Bangladesh. This college is also known as "Faizunnesa College."  As a result of freeing the college from political instability, the college has been recognized as one of the best academic institutions of the upazila (third level administrative division in Bangladesh, similar to town or borough).

History 
Nawab Faizunnesa Govt. College was founded by Nawab Begum Faizunnesa Chowdhury a pioneer of women's education of Bengal and also of the Indian subcontinent in 1873 as a school.

Academics 
The present Principal is Prof.Mita Safinaz, the administration is trying to make this educational institution a success in many respects. At present its number of students is more than 5 thousand.

Courses and faculties

The college has honors courses in seven subjects: 
 English
 Economics
 Political science
 Accounting
 Management
 Mathematics
 Zoology

In addition to higher secondary and degree (pass) in: 
 Science
 Humanities
 Business education

Bachelors 
 B.A.
 B.S.S.
 B.S.C.
 B.B.S.

Credit system and grading scale 
There's no mandatory national credit system in Bangladesh—credit systems vary by institution. However, Nawab Faizunnesa Government College use Grade Point Average (GPA) for the students of HSC and equivalent, and Cumulative Grade Point Average for the rest of higher education.

Eligibility for admission 
Minimum score in Secondary School Certificate (SSC, or equivalent) is needed for admission in 11th grade:

 Minimum GPA in Science is 4.00
 Minimum GPA in Humanities is 2.50
 Minimum GPA in Business Education is 3.50

Labs 
The college has several labs to impart practical education to the students in various subjects. These include:
 Computer lab
 Science Lab

References 

Colleges in Bangladesh
Academic institutions associated with the Bengal Renaissance
Educational institutions established in 1943
Colleges in Comilla District
Education in Bangladesh
1943 establishments in India